Jerica Tandiman (November 2, 1994) is an American speed skater.

Early life 
Tandiman is from Kearns, Utah. She began skating in 2002 after the Utah Olympic Oval was built near her house.

Career 
At the 2018 Winter Olympics United States speed skating trials, she finished 4th in the 1000 meters. While the top three normally qualify for the team, since Mia Manganello did not have the required qualifying time at that distance, Tandiman was one of the top three qualifiers for the event.  She had to wait to see the total number of qualified female athletes, but ultimately made the team. She currently practices at the Utah Olympic Oval.

References

External links
 

Living people
Place of birth missing (living people)
American female speed skaters
Speed skaters at the 2018 Winter Olympics
Olympic speed skaters of the United States
People from Kearns, Utah
21st-century American women
1994 births